Régis Rey (born April 8, 1929) is a French ski jumper who competed in the early 1950s. He finished 38th in the individual large hill event at the 1952 Winter Olympics in Oslo. He's an older brother of Robert Rey.

References

 Olympic ski jumping results: 1948-60

External links
 Régis Robert Rey at Sports Reference

1929 births
Living people
Olympic ski jumpers of France
Ski jumpers at the 1952 Winter Olympics
Ski jumpers at the 1956 Winter Olympics
French male ski jumpers